Magnet is the fifth solo album by Robin Gibb of the Bee Gees, released in 2003, just two weeks after the death of his twin brother and bandmate, Maurice. The song "Love Hurts" was originally recorded by The Everly Brothers, and he re-recorded the songs "Another Lonely Night in New York" (originally released in 1983 on How Old Are You?) and "Wish You Were Here" (released in 1989, from the Bee Gees' album One).

Track listing

Personnel
 Robin Gibb – lead vocals
 Deconzo Smith – keyboards, guitar, bass guitar
 Janyelle Crawford – backing vocals on "No Doubt"
 Shane Dement – backing vocals on "No Doubt"
 Jud Mahoney – backing vocals on "Special"
 Emmanuel Officer – backing vocals on "Don't Rush", "Watching You", "Earth Angel"
 Grant Mitchell – keyboards, synthesizer, programming, backing vocals on "Wait Forever"
 Kevin Brown – guitar on "Wait Forever"
 Paul Holmes – backing vocals on "Wait Forever"
 Errol Reid – backing vocals on "Wait Forever", "Please", "Love Hurts"
 Graham Kearns – guitar on "Love Hurts"
 Michael Graves – keyboards, synthesizer and programming on "Please"

References

2003 albums
Robin Gibb albums
SPV GmbH albums